Eternal Summer is a 2006 Taiwanese film starring Joseph Chang, Ray Chang and Kate Yeung. It was directed by Leste Chen. The film tells the story of three high school students who experience the agonies and ecstasies of love.

The film received four nominations at the 43rd Golden Horse Awards, where Ray Chang won the award for Best New Performer.

Plot
As a child living in a seaside town in southern Taiwan, studious Jonathan (Ray Chang) was asked by his concerned teacher to look after rebellious classmate Shane (Joseph Chang). Ten years later, what was once a good-natured obligation has since blossomed into a warm friendship, with Jonathan still on the academic track and Shane now finding his calling on the basketball court. 

Taiwan-born schoolgirl Carrie (Kate Yeung) arrives from Hong Kong to join her mother after a disagreement with her father and transfers to their school. She befriends Jonathan and convinces him to join her on a secret day-trip to Taipei and in the evening she seduces him in a sleazy hotel but Jonathan backs down clearly distraught. Eventually, her observations of his and Shane's friendship leads her to believe that he is gay and in love with his best friend.

Carrie then meets Shane through Jonathan after a school day where Shane develops an interest in Carrie. Despite her initial misgivings about the boorish Shane, she eventually gives in to the troublemaker's roguish charms. She accepts his offer to become his girlfriend on the condition that he manages to enter university.

Later, Shane pulls his act together and gets into university,  while Jonathan, distracted by his burgeoning sexual identity crisis, does not. Shane does his best to keep secret his feelings for Carrie in order to protect the feelings of his lifelong friend. Despite all their best efforts to keep their personal feelings secret, the truth eventually emerges, forcing all three to view their relationships in an entirely new light.

Following a party, Shane is hit by a car while riding his motorbike. Jonathan comes in to bring him back home. There Shane suddenly initiates and they have sex. Early next morning while Shane is still asleep, Jonathan calls Carrie to always look after Shane and then leaves. 

Shortly after, Shane takes Jonathan and Carrie to the beach. Jonathan tells Shane they should stop seeing each other. Furious, Shane tackles Jonathan to the ground and asks if he really means it. Carrie leaves the two boys alone and watches from the car. Shane repeats again that best friends can tell each other anything. Jonathan says that Shane may no longer want to be friends anymore but finally confesses his romantic feelings for him. Shane tells Jonathan about his loneliness since childhood, how he always knew the teacher forced Jonathan to be his friend, and that he still truly sees Jonathan as his best friend..

Cast
 Joseph Chang as Shane (余守恒)
 Ray Chang as Jonathan (康正行)
 Kate Yeung as Carrie (慧嘉)

Soundtrack

Awards and nominations
Eternal Summer won one awards out of four nominations at the 43rd Golden Horse Awards in 2006.

References

External links
 
 

Chinese LGBT-related films
2000s Mandarin-language films
2006 films
Films set in Taiwan
Gay-related films
LGBT-related drama films
Taiwanese LGBT-related films
Films directed by Leste Chen
Taiwanese drama films
2006 LGBT-related films